Nacanieli Seru (born 20 July 1969 in Gau) is a Fijian rugby union footballer. He plays as a prop.

He is 1.78m tall and weighs 115 kg. He made his international debut on the tour to Australia in June 2003. A long-time member of the Suva squad, Naca won the selectors over with his aggressive front-row efforts at the trials that May. He got his first taste of action in Fiji's opening match of 2003 – a narrow one-point loss to the ACT Brumbies in Canberra, and later he made his Test debut coming on as a replacement against Argentina.

Seru also played rugby league in Australia before featuring for the Fiji Bati side from 1994 - 1996. He played for the Fiji National Rugby League side against Australia during the Super League war.

He also played rugby union in Melbourne, Australia for the Powerhouse Rugby Club and Morrabin Rugby Club. He was also a member of the Victoria State side from 1997 - 1998. He was a member of the Fiji team to the 2003 Rugby World Cup.

External links
 Profile

1969 births
Living people
People from Gau Island
Doping cases in rugby union
Fijian rugby union players
Rugby union props
Fiji international rugby union players
I-Taukei Fijian people